Hanamune Tameike Dam is an earthfill dam located in Fukuoka Prefecture in Japan. The dam is used for irrigation. The catchment area of the dam is 25 km2. The dam impounds about 35  ha of land when full and can store 3289 thousand cubic meters of water. The construction of the dam was completed in 1952.

References

Dams in Fukuoka Prefecture
1952 establishments in Japan